The  is a rapid transit electric multiple unit (EMU) train type operated by the Transportation Bureau City of Nagoya on the Nagoya Subway Higashiyama Line in Japan since 2008.

Formation
, the fleet consists of 20 six-car sets, formed as follows.

One car is designated as a "women-only car" during the morning and evening peak periods on weekdays as a measure to reduce sexual assault during crowded times.

Interior

Build histories
The individual unit build details are as follows.

References

External links

 Nagoya Transportation Bureau's technical details about the N1000 series 

Electric multiple units of Japan
N1000 series
Train-related introductions in 2008
600 V DC multiple units
Nippon Sharyo multiple units